The Canon EF-M 22mm f/2 STM is an interchangeable wide-angle lens announced by Canon on July 23, 2012. It was not available from Canon USA until the 27th of August 2015, but it was available as part of a kit with the EOS M in 2012.

As a pancake lens, it is the physically shortest Canon lens available on the EF-M mount. Its 22mm focal length has the same field of view on an EOS M-series camera as a 35mm lens on a full-frame camera.

References

http://www.dpreview.com/products/canon/lenses/canon_m_22_2/specifications
https://web.archive.org/web/20150923031817/http://www.canon.de/for_home/product_finder/cameras/ef_lenses/ef-m/ef_m_55-200mm_f_4.5_6.3_is_stm/
https://web.archive.org/web/20150616021437/http://www.canon.de/images/Preisliste_Canon_Consumer_Produkte_08062015_tcm83-376784.pdf

External links

Canon EF-M-mount lenses
Camera lenses introduced in 2012